The High Commission of the United Kingdom  in Dhaka is the chief diplomatic mission of the United Kingdom in Bangladesh. It is located on United Nations Road in the Baridhara suburb. The current High Commissioner is Robert Chatterton Dickson  who was appointed in March 2019.

History
The first British diplomatic mission to be established in Dhaka (then spelled as "Dacca") was the Office of the British Deputy High Commissioner, established following the independence of what was then the East Bengal province of the Dominion of Pakistan, later East Pakistan in the Islamic Republic of Pakistan.

On 4 February 1972 Britain recognised Bangladesh's independence, which eventually led to recognition from other European and Commonwealth nations and Bangladesh's induction into the Commonwealth on 18 April 1972. Britain established a High Commission in Dhaka in 1972, Anthony Golds was the first British High Commissioner to Bangladesh.

The High Commission also represents the British Overseas Territories in Bangladesh.

See also
 Bangladesh–United Kingdom relations
 List of diplomatic missions in Bangladesh
 List of High Commissioners of the United Kingdom to Bangladesh

References

 British High Commissioner to Bangladesh: Robert Chatterton Dickson

Dhaka
United Kingdom
Bangladesh–United Kingdom relations